Dream T Entertainment Co.,Ltd. is a former South Korean entertainment company established in 2009 by Lee Jong-seok.

In 2013, Imagine Asia became a majority shareholder of Dream T after acquired 100% of the entire company.

In July 2015, Dream T Entertainment announced that they had acquired 41% of YMC Entertainment's shares along Dream T Entertainment parents company, Imagine Asia also acquired 39% of YMC Entertainment's shares.

Former artists
Girl's Day (2010–2019)
Jisun (2010)
Jiin (2010)
Jihae (2010–2012)
Sojin (2010–2019)
Yura (2010–2019)
Minah (2010–2019)
Hyeri (2010–2019)
Jevice (2012–2014)
MC Mong (2016–2018)
MAP6 (2016–2018)
 I'M (2016–2018)
Ji Hyun-woo (2016–2019)
Hyang Un-mi
Lee Ji-an
Kim Min-jun (2017–2019)
Baek Seung-heon (2017–2019)
Hong Soo-ah (2016–2019)

Filmography
 Secrets of Women (KBS2 serial, 2016) (with DK E&M)

References

External links
 

K-pop record labels
South Korean record labels
Talent agencies of South Korea
Entertainment companies established in 2009
Record labels established in 2009
Television production companies of South Korea
Defunct record labels of South Korea